Blazenko Bekavac (born February 4, 1975) is a former Croatian footballer who played in the Croatian First Football League, Regionalliga Süd, Canadian Professional Soccer League, and the Football League.

Playing career 
Bekavac played with NK Mladost 127 in the Croatian First Football League in 1999, where he would appear in a total of 14 matches. In 2000, he went to Germany to sign with 1. FC Schweinfurt 05 in the Regionalliga Süd. In 2004, he went overseas to Canada to sign with Hamilton Thunder of the Canadian Professional Soccer League. During his tenure with Hamilton he won the Western Conference title, and qualified for the postseason. He featured in the semi-final match against Toronto Croatia, and lost the match to a score of 2-0. In 2006, he returned to Europe to sign with PAS Lamia 1964 of the Football League. In 2009, he played and retired with NK HAŠK.

References 

1975 births
Living people
Association football defenders
Croatian footballers
HNK Suhopolje players
1. FC Schweinfurt 05 players
Hamilton Thunder players
PAS Lamia 1964 players
NK HAŠK players
Croatian Football League players
Regionalliga players
Canadian Soccer League (1998–present) players
Football League (Greece) players
Croatian expatriate footballers
Expatriate footballers in Germany
Croatian expatriate sportspeople in Germany
Expatriate soccer players in Canada
Croatian expatriate sportspeople in Canada
Expatriate footballers in Greece
Croatian expatriate sportspeople in Greece